The Lincoln Lawyer is a 2005 novel, the 16th by American crime writer Michael Connelly. It introduces Los Angeles attorney Mickey Haller, half-brother of Connelly's mainstay character Detective Hieronymus "Harry" Bosch.

It was adapted as a 2011 film of the same name, starring Matthew McConaughey.

Plot
Moderately successful criminal defense attorney Mickey Haller operates around Los Angeles County out of a Lincoln Town Car (hence the title) driven by a former client working off his legal fees. While most of his clients are drug dealers and gangsters, the story focuses on an unusually important case of wealthy Los Angeles realtor  Louis Roulet, accused of assault and attempted murder. At first, he appears to be innocent and set up by the female "victim".

Roulet's lies and many surprising revelations change Haller's original case theory. He reconsiders the situation of Jesus Menendez, a former client serving time in San Quentin State Prison after pleading guilty to a similar and mysteriously related crime.

Haller outmaneuvers Roulet (revealed to be a rapist and murderer) without violating ethical obligations, frees the innocent Menendez, and continues in legal practice. He also conducts much self-examination and acquires some emotional baggage.

Characters
 Mickey Haller - criminal defense lawyer
 Margaret McPherson - Haller's ex-wife, prosecuting attorney
 Louis Ross Roulet - the accused
 Ted Minton - prosecutor in Roulet's case
 Fernando Valenzuela - The Bondsman
 Jesus Menendez -  Haller's  former client 
 Dwayne Corliss - jailhouse snitch
 Reggie Campo - Roulet's alleged victim  
 Martha Renteria - Menendez's alleged murder victim
 Raul Levin - Haller's investigator and colleague in Roulet's case
 Lorna Taylor - Haller's manager and ex-wife
 Cecil C. Dobbs - the Roulet family lawyer
 Mary Windsor - Louis Roulet's mother
 Detective Howard Kurlen - the lead detective on the Jesus Menendez case
 Detectives Lankford and Sobel - two cops who investigate Levin's murder

Reception
The New York Times wrote: "Mastering the [legal thriller] on his first try, Connelly delivers a powerhouse drama fueled by cynicism and driven by a criminal defense lawyer named Michael Haller ('People call me Mickey') who works for the scum of the earth and makes no apologies."

In other media

Film adaptation

The novel was adapted as a 2011 film of the same name, starring Matthew McConaughey as Haller and Marisa Tomei as Maggie McPherson. The film was directed by Brad Furman from a screenplay by John Romano, and produced by Stone Village Pictures. Lionsgate holds the US distribution rights, and Lakeshore Entertainment holds international rights.

Television series 

On June 25, 2019, it was announced that David E. Kelley had developed and written a television series based on the Haller series with a commitment from CBS. However, on May 2, 2020 it was announced that the pilot would not be moving forward. Netflix subsequently picked up the series and ordered a 10-episode series of The Lincoln Lawyer, with Kelley, on January 11, 2021. Despite the same name of the eponymous novel, the series is based on Connelly's second Mickey Haller novel, The Brass Verdict. Filming for the series began on March 31, 2021. On April 6, 2022, the series was given a May 13, 2022 premiere date.

Awards
The novel received much attention from the mystery community. It won the 2006 Shamus Award and Macavity Award for "Best Novel". It was also nominated in the 2006 Anthony Awards for the same honor.

Additionally, in 2010 it was nominated in the "Best Mystery Novel of the Decade" category of the Barry Awards, although it lost to Stieg Larsson, author of The Girl with the Dragon Tattoo.

References

2005 American novels
American novels adapted into films
American novels adapted into television shows
Novels by Michael Connelly
Novels set in Los Angeles
Mass media in Los Angeles County, California
Macavity Award-winning works
Shamus Award-winning works